Granulifusus geometricus is a species of sea snail, a marine gastropod mollusk in the family Fasciolariidae, the spindle snails, the tulip snails and their allies.

Description
The length of the shell attains 10.5 mm.

Distribution
This marine species occurs off the Tonga Islands.

References

geometricus
Gastropods described in 2005